Schiffer Publishing Ltd. (also known for its imprints Schiffer, Schiffer Craft, Schiffer Military History, Schiffer Kids, REDFeather MBS, Cornell Maritime Press, Tidewater Publishers, Thrums Books, Geared Up Publications ) is a  family-owned publisher of nonfiction books founded in 1974. Based in Atglen, Pennsylvania, its coverage includes antiques, architecture and design, arts and crafts, collectibles, lifestyle, children's books, regional, military history, militaria, tarot and oracle, and mind, body, and spirit. Schiffer's military imprint has been criticized by two American historians as providing a distorted portrayal of the German armed forces during World War II. 

In 2009, Schiffer Publishing acquired Cornell Maritime Press/Tidewater Publishers. In October 2020 Schiffer Publishing announced their purchase of Thrums Books which specializes in telling the stories of indigenous craft traditions from around the world. Its award-winning, illustrated titles have featured artisans in Peru, Guatemala, Mexico, Morocco, Afghanistan, China and more.

Reception
Schiffer Publishing has been described by American historians Ronald Smelser and Edward J. Davies in their 2006 work The Myth of the Eastern Front as one of the leading publishers of war romancing literature, second in North America only to the Canadian publisher J.J. Fedorowicz.  According to Smelser and Davies, Schiffer provides a platform for authors who present an uncritical and ahistorical portrayal of the German war effort during the Soviet-German war of 1941–1945.

Schiffer has a strong focus on the German side of the conflict, with 204 titles in its 1996 military history catalogue being dedicated to the German war effort, out of a total of 234 titles. The catalogue described one of Schiffer's titles as the story of "the great aces" who "could not win, yet they fought to the final hour in an unforgettable combat saga".

References

General references

Inline citations

External links
 

Publishing companies of the United States
Book publishing companies based in Pennsylvania